A statue of Robert Gascoyne-Cecil, 3rd Marquess of Salisbury, stands outside the gates leading to the north side of Hatfield House, Hertfordshire.

The front (west) side of the plinth bears a relief carving of the Salisbury coat of arms, and the inscription 1830–1903.

The statue became a Grade II listed building in 1983.  It stands to the west of the gates and screen (separately listed at Grade II) erected by The 3rd Marquess of Salisbury on the approach from Hatfield railway station to Hatfield Park and the north side of Hatfield House (itself Grade I listed).  To the north of the statue is the Grade II* listed Hatfield War Memorial.

References

Sculptures by George Frampton
Buildings and structures in Hertfordshire
Gascoyne-Cecil, Robert
Statues of prime ministers of the United Kingdom
Outdoor sculptures in England
Hatfield, Hertfordshire
Buildings and structures in Welwyn Hatfield (district)
Buildings and structures completed in 1906